List of monastic houses in Wales is a catalogue of abbeys, priories, friaries and other monastic religious houses in Wales.

In this article, alien houses are included, as are smaller establishments such as cells and notable monastic granges (particularly those with resident monks), and also camerae of the military orders of monks (Templars and Hospitallers).  The numerous monastic hospitals per se are not included here unless at some time the foundation had, or was purported to have, the status or function of an abbey, priory, friary, preceptory or commandery.

The geographical co-ordinates provided are sourced from details provided by Ordnance Survey publications.

Overview

Article layout
Communities/provenance: this column shows the status and communities existing at each establishment, together with such dates as have been established as well as the fate of the establishment after dissolution, and the current status of the site.

Formal Name or Dedication: this column shows the formal name of the establishment or the person in whose name the church is dedicated, where known.

Alternative Names: some of the establishments have had alternative names over the course of time.  In order to assist in text-searching such alternatives in name or spelling have been provided.

Abbreviations and key

Locations with names in italics indicate probable duplication (misidentification with another location)or non-existent foundations (either erroneous reference or proposed foundation never implemented).

List of establishments by county

Anglesey

Bridgend

Cardiff

Carmarthenshire

Ceredigion

Conwy

Denbighshire

Flintshire

Gwynedd

{| style="width:99%;" class="wikitable"
|-
! style="width:15%;"|Foundation
! style="width:5%;"|Image
! style="width:30%;"|Communities & provenance
! style="width:20%;"|Formal name or dedication & alternative names
! style="width:10%;"|On-line references & location
|- valign=top
|Aberdaron Clas
|
|Celtic monks — from Bardsey; founded 6th century by St Hyrwyn, disciple of St Dubricius;abbey 8th century;secular collegiate to after 1252
|
|
|- valign=top
|Bangor Blackfriars
|
|Dominican Friars (under the Visitation of Oxford)founded before 1251 by Llywelyn ap Gruffydd;purportedly enlarged/rebuilt 1299;dissolved 1538; granted to Thomas Brown 1553;converted into a Free School 1557
|
|
|- valign=top
|Bangor Monastery
|
|Celtic monksfounded 6th century;secular collegiateepiscopal diocesan cathedralfounded c.1092; extant
|The Cathedral Church of Saint Deniol, Bangor
|
|- valign=top
|Bardsey Abbey 
|
|Culdee monksfounded c./before 516?;Augustinian Canons Regularfounded before 1240 (c.1210) by Llywelyn the Great of Gwynedd;dissolved c.1537; granted to John, Earl of Warwick 1549/50;in ownership of Bardsey Island Trust, with public access
|The Abbey of Saint Mary
|
|- valign=top
|Beddgelert Priory 
|
|Celtic monksfounded 6th/7th century;Augustinian Canons Regularfounded c.1198 (c.1200–40) by Llywelyn the Great;granted to the Carthusians at Chertsey, Surrey 1537;dissolved with it 19 June 1538; granted to Lord Radnor by Henry VIII
|The Priory Church of Saint Mary, Beddgelertnow The Priory and Parish Church of Saint Mary, BeddgelertBethkelert Priory;Bekelert; 'the priory of the Valley St Mary of Snowdon(ia)' 
| & 
|- valign=top
|Clynnog Fawr Abbey
|
|Celtic monksfounded c.616 by St Beuno;dissolved before 1291;Cistercian monks?refounded 13th century;secular collegiaterefounded before 1291;dissolved 1547;parochial church reputedly on site
|Clynnog Fawr Monastery;Clynnog-fawr Abbey
|
|- valign=top
|Corwen Monastery
|
|Celtic monksfounded 6th–7th century;dissolution unknown
|
|
|- valign=top
|Cymer Abbey
| 
|Cistercian monksdaughter house of Cwm Hir;founded 1198/9 by Gruffudd and Maredudd ap Cynan (or Llywelyn ab Iorwerth (Lleweline son of Gervase);dissolved 1536;(Cadw)
|The Abbey Church of the Blessed Virgin Mary, LlanelltydCymmer Abbey;Mynachlog y FanerKinner Abbey
|
|- valign=top
|Rhedynog-felen Abbey
|
|Cistercian monksdaughter house of Strata Floridafounded 27 (24) July 1186removed to Aberconwy c.1190 (not later than 1192)
|The Blessed Virgin Mary
|
|- valign=top
|St Tudwal's Island Monastery
|
|Celtic monks, Culdeesfounded 6th century;Augustinian Canons Regularfounded before 1417;dissolved 1535(?)
|Ynys Tudwal Monastery;Modstedwall Monastery
|
|- valign=top
|Towyn Clas
|
|Celtic monks''' — from Bardseyfounded 6th century by St Cadfan from Bardsey;under an abbot 1147
|
|
|}

Monmouthshire

Neath Port Talbot

Newport

Pembrokeshire

Powys

Rhondda Cynon Taf

Swansea

Torfaen

Vale of Glamorgan

Wrexham

See also
List of abbeys and priories
List of monastic houses in England
List of monastic houses in Scotland
List of monastic houses on the Isle of Man
List of monastic houses in Ireland
Dissolution of the monasteries
List of castles in Wales
List of museums in Wales
List of country houses in the United Kingdom

Notes

References

Anthony New, A guide to the abbeys of England and Wales, Constable, 1985
Henry Thorold, Collins Guide to Cathedrals, Abbeys and Priories of England and Wales, Collins, 1986
Henry Thorold, Collins Guide to the Ruined Abbeys of England, Wales and Scotland, Collins, 1993
Geoffrey N. Wright, Discovering Abbeys and Priories, Shire Publications Ltd. 2004
Richard Morris, Cathedrals and Abbeys of England and Wales, JM Dent & Sons Ltd. 1979
 Knowles, David & Hadcock, R. Neville (1971) Medieval Religious Houses England & Wales. Longman
M.R. James, Abbeys, The Grammar School, Thornbury, Glos. 1925
David Robinson, The Cistercian Abbeys of Britain, B.T.Batsford with English Heritage, CADW, Historic Scotland, 2002
Derry Brabbs, Abbeys and Monasteries, Weidenfeld & Nicolson, 1999Map of Monastic Britain, South Sheet, Ordnance Survey, 2nd Edition, 1954
William Cobbett, List Of Abbeys, Priories, Nunneries, Hospitals: And Other Religious Foundations In England And Wales And In Ireland, Confiscated, Seized On, Or Alienated, By The Protestant "Reformation" Sovereigns And Parliaments, Thomas Richardson and Son; Dublin and Derby, 1868British History Online'' British History Online | The core printed primary and secondary sources for the medieval and modern history of the British Isles

External links
Royal Commission on the Ancient and Historical Monuments of Wales in English and Welsh
Monastic Wales research project database

Medieval sites in Wales
 
Lists of religious buildings and structures in Wales
Wales
Abbeys and priories in Wales
Wales